Ambulyx naessigi is a species of moth of the  family Sphingidae. It is known from the Moluccas.

References

Ambulyx
Moths described in 1998
Moths of Indonesia